The Askin–Cutler ministry (1965–1968) or First Askin ministry was the 62nd ministry of the New South Wales Government, and was led by the 32nd Premier, Bob Askin, of the Liberal Party in coalition with the Country Party, led by Charles Cutler. The ministry was the first occasion in the history of Government in New South Wales that the Liberal and Country Party formed a coalition in government. It was also the first of six occasions when Askin was Premier; and when Cutler was Deputy Premier.

Background
Askin was elected to the New South Wales Legislative Assembly in 1950 and served continuously up until 1975, representing variously the seats of Collaroy and Pittwater. Rising through the Liberal Party ranks, Askin served as Deputy Leader from 1954 until he was elected Leader of the NSW Liberal Party and Leader of the NSW Opposition, following the defeat of the Morton/Hughes–led coalition by Cahill's Labor at the 1959 election. Cutler was elected to the NSW Legislative Assembly in 1947 and served continuously up until 1975, representing the seat of Orange. Elected Deputy Leader of the Country Party in 1958 and, like Askin, Cutler was elected as leader of his party following the 1959 state election, replacing Davis Hughes. The Askin/Cutler–led Liberal/Country coalition was defeated at the 1962 election by Labor's Bob Heffron. In April 1964 Jack Renshaw replaced Heffron as Leader of the Labor Party and became Premier. Twelve months later, Renshaw called an election held on 13 May 1965; however after 24 years of consecutive Labor governments, Askin and Cutler led the coalition to government at the 1965 state election.

Composition of ministry

This ministry covers the period from 13 May 1965 until 5 March 1968, when Askin and Cutler led the Liberal/Country coalition to a second term at the 1968 state election, defeating Labor, again led by Jack Renshaw.

 
Ministers are members of the Legislative Assembly unless otherwise noted.

See also

Members of the New South Wales Legislative Assembly, 1965–1968
Members of the New South Wales Legislative Council, 1964–1967
Members of the New South Wales Legislative Council, 1967–1970

References

 

New South Wales ministries
1965 establishments in Australia
1968 disestablishments in Australia